Kewanee may refer to:

Places
 Kewanee, Illinois
 Kewanee station
 Hotel Kewanee, a 1916 hotel, now senior housing
 Kewanee, Kentucky
 Kewanee, Mississippi
 Kewanee, Missouri

Other
, a 1863 Pawtuxet-class screw steam revenue cutter built for the United States Revenue Marine
Kewanee Walworths, a 1919–1920 American football team

See also
 Kewanna, Indiana
 
 Kewaunee (disambiguation)